Todd Thomas (Murphysboro, Illinois, 1961) is an American creative director and fashion designer. He lives and works in New York City and St. Louis. He is notable for his eleven year work creating Victoria's Secret Fashion Show, designing custom pieces for Katy Perry, Nicki Minaj, and Debbie Harry.
 He is Senior Director for Barrett-Barrerra where he works with Christeene Vale, PJ Raval, and Charlie Le Mindu.

He started his career in St. Louis and moved to New York City in 1983 where he started doing costumes for the films Angela (1995) and Office Killer (1997).

In 2013, Thomas designed the wardrobe for the band Heloise and the Savoir Faire and their video Time Lords.

References

External links 
 
 
 Official Instagram

Living people
1961 births
American brands
American fashion businesspeople
American fashion designers
High fashion brands